Sir Herbert Andrew McVeigh (8 December 1908 – 3 October 1977), known as Bertie McVeigh, was a judge in Northern Ireland.

Born in Derry, McVeigh studied at Foyle College and Queen's University Belfast and became a barrister in 1931.  He became a QC in 1948, then a High Court judge in 1956, and was appointed to the Court of Appeals in 1964.  In 1965, he was appointed to the Privy Council of Northern Ireland.

References

1908 births
1977 deaths
Alumni of Queen's University Belfast
Members of the Privy Council of Northern Ireland
Lawyers from Derry (city)
Lords Justice of Appeal of Northern Ireland
People educated at Foyle College
High Court judges of Northern Ireland
Northern Ireland King's Counsel